Notocrater houbricki is a species of small sea snail, a marine gastropod mollusk in the family Pseudococculinidae, the false limpets.

Distribution
This species occurs in the Atlantic Ocean off the Bahamas and off the Caribbean coast of Colombia.

Description 
The maximum recorded shell length is 3.3 mm.

Habitat 
Minimum recorded depth is 89 m. Maximum recorded depth is 412 m.

References

 McLean, J. H. and M. G. Harasewych. 1995. Review of Western Atlantic species of cocculinid and pseudococculinid limpets, with descriptions of new species (Gastropoda: Cocculiniformia). Contributions in Science, Natural History Museum of Los Angeles County 453: 1-33.

External links
 To Barcode of Life (1 barcode)
 To Biodiversity Heritage Library (1 publication)
 To USNM Invertebrate Zoology Mollusca Collection

Pseudococculinidae
Gastropods described in 1995